Arhopala sakaguchii is a butterfly of the family Lycaenidae first described by Hisakazu Hayashi in 1981. It is found on the Philippine islands of Negros and Mindoro.

References

  (1981). "New Lycaenid Butterflies from the Philippines". Tyô to Ga. 32 (1,2): 63–82.
  (1985). "On the Female of Narathura sakaguchii (Lepidoptera: Lycaenidae)". Tyô to Ga. 36 (1): 31.
 (1995). "Checklist of the butterflies of the Philippine Islands (Lepidoptera: Rhopalocera)". Nachrichten des Entomologischen Vereins Apollo. Suppl. 14: 7–118.

 (2005). "A revision of Arhopala aedias (Hewitson, 1862) and its allied species from the Philippunes (Lepidoptera: Lycaenidae)". Butterflies (Teinopalpus). 41: 19–26.
 (2012)." Revised checklist of the butterflies of the Philippine Islands (Lepidoptera: Rhopalocera)". Nachrichten des Entomologischen Vereins Apollo. Suppl. 20: 1-64.

Butterflies described in 1981
Arhopala
Butterflies of Asia